Deirdre Elaine "Dash" McKinley is a fictional character from the Australian drama series Blue Heelers, played by Tasma Walton. She made her first appearance in "The Kremin Factor", which was broadcast on 18 June 1996. One of her major storylines occurred during the 1998 season, when she was diagnosed with cancer. Dash was the youngest of nine children. She had a kind personality but a big mouth. She and her family always seemed to be the first to know the town's gossip and everyone's business. The character departed on 28 July 1999. She is the eleventh longest serving character after Tom Croydon, Chris Riley, P.J. Hasham, Maggie Doyle, Ben Stewart, Nick Schultz, Jo Parrish, Evan Jones, Adam Cooper and Tess Gallagher (Blue Heelers).

Casting
On 27 April 1996, Rachel Browne from The Sun-Herald reported Walton had joined the cast of Blue Heelers as Constable Deirdre McKinley. She added that Walton's first scenes would air in June of that year. In December 1998, Walton announced her departure from the series. Browne stated the actress would leave in the middle of 1999.

Storylines

Season 4
Dash first appeared in the season three episode "The Kremin Factor". She refused to call Tom Croydon 'boss', instead calling her superior by his first name. She and Tom got off to a dreadful start; while talking to the others about Tom, Dash stated that he was fat and old, not knowing he was behind her. Dash also couldn't drive, losing her police licence back at Fitzroy.

Season 5
The beginning of Season 5 the episodes "Secrets, part 1 and 2" marked Dash's 21st birthday. At the same time her Constable accreditation had come through (ending her probation) and the Heelers decided to use the two occasions to have a surprise celebration to mark the events. Unfortunately before the upcoming celebration, Dash is taken hostage, along with a school class in an awkward custody case.

Later on in the season, in the episode "Deed not the Breed" she discovers she has cancer; she then undergoes heavy chemotherapy, and eventually recovers. She also has a brief relationship with Adam Cooper.

Season 6
In the official sixth season of Blue Heelers, Dash quickly found herself pursuing relationships with the new members, eventually falling to her knees over the idea of fulfilling the future needs as a hopeful co-detective alongside the upper-ranked PJ. This idea was first prompted upon the orders of Inspector Monica Draper, who at the time appeared to have a serious personality clash with rising rank ' Taylor '. This would soon give McKinley her very first chance, submitting herself towards the idolised career choice. Unfortunately in doing this, McKinley's hopeful career would somewhat fall short and ironically come to a sudden end following the shocking death of her very close Mother.

Reception
For her portrayal of Dash, Walton won Most Popular New Talent at the 1997 Logie Awards. Following Dash's introduction, Robin Oliver of The Sydney Morning Herald said "The Heelers adroitly acquired a bit of popular silliness with the arrival of the good-looking, good-hearted young Dash (Tasma Walton), a walking disaster area who this week is sent on a burglary inquiry and is overcome with desire to own the victim's car."

References

Blue Heelers characters
Fictional Australian police officers
Television characters introduced in 1996